Harriet Henry, formally known as Countess Harriet Henry de Steuch, (1897–1974) was an American novelist.

In the 1930s and 1940s, she wrote sixteen novels and was on the staff of Vogue. Two of her books were made into films.

Harriet Henry was married to Count Nils de Steuch of Sweden.

Henry was from New York and died in Tucson, Arizona, on April 19, 1974, aged 77.

Bibliography

Halves (1928)
Jackdaw's Strut (1930)
Lady with a Past (1931)
Touch Us Gently (1933)
We Walk Alone (1935)
No More, No Less (1938)
Widow's Peak (1940)
Shake Down the Stairs
Bearing False Witness
When is a Lady
Rakish Halo
Burn, Candle, Burn
Sing All the Summer

Filmography

 Bought (1931) (originally to be titled White Collar Girl) was based on her novel Jackdaw's Strut
 Lady with a Past (1932) was based on her novel of the same name

References 

20th-century American women writers
Vogue (magazine) people
1897 births
1974 deaths
20th-century American novelists
American women novelists
Novelists from New York (state)